This article contains information about the literary events and publications of 1514.

Events
May 15 – The earliest printed edition of Saxo Grammaticus' 12th-century Scandinavian history Gesta Danorum, edited by Christiern Pedersen from an original found near Lund, is published as Danorum Regum heroumque Historiae by Jodocus Badius in Paris.
unknown dates
Gregorio de Gregorii begins printing Kitab Salat al-Sawa'i (a Christian book of hours), the first known book printed in the Arabic alphabet using movable type, in Venice, falsely assigned to Fano.
Clément Marot presents his poem Judgment of Minos to Francis I of France and begins styling himself facteur de la reine ("queen's poet") to Queen Claude.

New books

Prose
Desiderius Erasmus (attributed) – Julius Excluded from Heaven (Julius exclusus de caelis)

Poetry

Births
February 8 – Daniele Barbaro, Italian humanist polymath, writer and translator (died 1570)
November 29 – Andreas Musculus, German theologian (died 1581)
unknown date – Al-Akhdari, Arabic poet (died 1546)

Deaths
October 7 – Bernardo Rucellai, Florentine historian (born 1448)
November 28 - Hartmann Schedel, German humanist historian and cartographer (born 1440)
unknown dates
Peter Crockaert, Flemish philosopher
Nicolaus Ragvaldi, Swedish monk and translator

References

1514

1514 books
Years of the 16th century in literature